
Gmina Wieliszew is a rural gmina (administrative district) in Legionowo County, Masovian Voivodeship, in east-central Poland.

Villages
Gmina Wieliszew contains the villages and settlements of Góra, Janówek Pierwszy, Kałuszyn, Komornica, Krubin, Łajski, Michałów-Reginów, Olszewnica Nowa, Olszewnica Stara, Poddębie, Sikory, Skrzeszew, Topolina and Wieliszew.

Neighbouring gminas
Gmina Wieliszew is bordered by the towns of Legionowo and Nowy Dwór Mazowiecki, and by the gminas of Jabłonna, Nieporęt, Pomiechówek and Serock.

References

Polish official population figures 2017

Wieliszew
Legionowo County